Ernesto Montero Bicumba (born 17 April 1998) is an Equatoguinean footballer who plays as a left back for Liga Nacional de Fútbol club Cano Sport Academy and the Equatorial Guinea national team.

International career
Montero made his international debut for Equatorial Guinea in 2018.

References

1998 births
Living people
Sportspeople from Malabo
Equatoguinean footballers
Association football fullbacks
Cano Sport Academy players
Equatorial Guinea international footballers
Equatorial Guinea A' international footballers
2018 African Nations Championship players